Engine Company No. 28 is a former Los Angeles Fire Department fire station on Figueroa Street in Downtown Los Angeles. One of the first reinforced concrete fire stations in the city, it is a Class A fire-proof structure built of brick, hollow tile and concrete. In 1979, the building was listed in the National Register of Historic Places.

In the late 1980s, it was renovated as a restaurant, "Engine Company No. 28.", that served food based on recipes from American fire houses.

The building was featured as an operating fire station in Los Angeles in the 2011 video game L.A. Noire.

Since 2007, the building has housed the law firm Geragos & Geragos, and is owned by Mark Geragos.

See also
 List of Registered Historic Places in Los Angeles

References

Buildings and structures in Downtown Los Angeles
Fire stations on the National Register of Historic Places in Los Angeles
Fire stations completed in 1912
1912 establishments in California
1910s architecture in the United States
Los Angeles Historic-Cultural Monuments
Defunct fire stations in California